The Saint Lucia national basketball team is the national men's basketball team from the island of Saint Lucia. It is administered by the St. Lucia Basketball Federation.

International Performance

FIBA AmeriCup
yet to qualify

Caribbean Championship
yet to participate

References

External links
St. Lucia Basketball Federation on facebook

Men's national basketball teams
Basketball in Saint Lucia
Basketball teams in Saint Lucia
1997 establishments in Saint Lucia
Basketball